Neptunium compounds are compounds containg the element neptunium (Np). Neptunium has five ionic oxidation states ranging from +3 to +7 when forming chemical compounds, which can be simultaneously observed in solutions. It is the heaviest actinide that can lose all its valence electrons in a stable compound. The most stable state in solution is +5, but the valence +4 is preferred in solid neptunium compounds. Neptunium metal is very reactive. Ions of neptunium are prone to hydrolysis and formation of coordination compounds.

Solution chemistry 

When it is in an aqueous solution, neptunium can exist in any of its five possible oxidation states (+3 to +7) and each of these show a characteristic color. The stability of each oxidation state is strongly dependent on various factors, such as the presence of oxidizing or reducing agents, pH of the solution, presence of coordination complex-forming ligands, and even the concentration of neptunium in the solution.

Not as much work has been done to characterize neptunium in basic solutions.

Neptunium(III)
Np(III) or Np3+ exists as hydrated complexes in acidic solutions, . It is a dark blue-purple and is analogous to its lighter congener, the pink rare-earth ion Pm3+. In the presence of oxygen, it is quickly oxidized to Np(IV) unless strong reducing agents are also present. Nevertheless, it is the second-least easily hydrolyzed neptunium ion in water, forming the NpOH2+ ion. Np3+ is the predominant neptunium ion in solutions of pH 4–5.

Neptunium(IV)
Np(IV) or Np4+ is pale yellow-green in acidic solutions, where it exists as hydrated complexes. It is quite unstable to hydrolysis in acidic aqueous solutions at pH 1 and above, forming NpOH3+. In basic solutions, Np4+ tends to hydrolyze to form the neutral neptunium(IV) hydroxide (Np(OH)4) and neptunium(IV) oxide (NpO2).

Neptunium(V)
It is a stable ion and is the most common form of neptunium in aqueous solutions.

2  + 4 H+ ⇌ Np4+ +  + 2 H2O

Neptunium(VI)
It is a strong Lewis acid and is the main neptunium ion encountered in solutions of pH 3–4. Though stable in acidic solutions, it is quite easily reduced to the Np(V) ion, and it is not as stable as the homologous hexavalent ions of its neighbours uranium and plutonium (the uranyl and plutonyl ions).

Neptunium(VII)
Np(VII) is dark green in a strongly basic solution. Np(VII) was first prepared in basic solution in 1967. Its hydrolysis products are uncharacterized.

Hydroxides 

The oxides and hydroxides of neptunium are closely related to its ions. In general, Np hydroxides at various oxidation levels are less stable than the actinides before it on the periodic table such as thorium and uranium and more stable than those after it such as plutonium and americium. This phenomenon is because the stability of an ion increases as the ratio of atomic number to the radius of the ion increases. Thus actinides higher on the periodic table will more readily undergo hydrolysis.

Neptunium(III) hydroxide is quite stable in acidic solutions and in environments that lack oxygen, but it will rapidly oxidize to the IV state in the presence of air. It is not soluble in water. Np(IV) hydroxides exist mainly as the electrically neutral Np(OH)4 and its mild solubility in water is not affected at all by the pH of the solution. This suggests that the other Np(IV) hydroxide, does not have a significant presence.

Because the Np(V) ion  is very stable, it can only form a hydroxide in high acidity levels. When placed in a 0.1 M sodium perchlorate solution, it does not react significantly for a period of months, although a higher molar concentration of 3.0 M will result in it reacting to the solid hydroxide NpO2OH almost immediately. Np(VI) hydroxide is more reactive but it is still fairly stable in acidic solutions. It will form the compound NpO3· H2O in the presence of ozone under various carbon dioxide pressures. Np(VII) has not been well-studied and no neutral hydroxides have been reported.

Oxides 

Three anhydrous neptunium oxides have been reported, NpO2, Np2O5, and Np5O8, though some studies have stated that only the first two of these exist, suggesting that claims of Np5O8 are actually the result of mistaken analysis of Np2O5. However, as the full extent of the reactions that occur between neptunium and oxygen has yet to be researched, it is not certain which of these claims is accurate. Although neptunium oxides have not been produced with neptunium in oxidation states as high as those possible with the adjacent actinide uranium, neptunium oxides are more stable at lower oxidation states. This behavior is illustrated by the fact that NpO2 can be produced by simply burning neptunium salts of oxyacids in air.

The greenish-brown NpO2 is very stable over a large range of pressures and temperatures and does not undergo phase transitions at low temperatures. It does show a phase transition from face-centered cubic to orthorhombic at around 33-37GPa, although it returns to is original phase when pressure is released. It remains stable under oxygen pressures up to 2.84 MPa and temperatures up to 400 °C. 
Np2O5 is black-brown in color and monoclinic with a lattice size of 418×658×409 picometres. It is relatively unstable and decomposes to NpO2 and O2 at 420-695 °C. Although Np2O5 was initially subject to several studies that claimed to produce it with mutually contradictory methods, it was eventually prepared successfully by heating neptunium peroxide to 300-350 °C for 2–3 hours or by heating it under a layer of water in an ampoule at 180 °C.

Neptunium also forms a large number of oxide compounds with a wide variety of elements, although the neptunate oxides formed with alkali metals and alkaline earth metals have been by far the most studied. Ternary neptunium oxides are generally formed by reacting NpO2 with the oxide of another element or by precipitating from an alkaline solution. Li5NpO6 has been prepared by reacting Li2O and NpO2 at 400 °C for 16 hours or by reacting Li2O2 with NpO3 · H2O at 400 °C for 16 hours in a quartz tube and flowing oxygen. Alkali neptunate compounds K3NpO5, Cs3NpO5, and Rb3NpO5 are all created by a similar reaction: 
NpO2 + 3 MO2 → M3NpO5 (M = K, Cs, Rb)

The oxide compounds KNpO4, CsNpO4, and RbNpO4 are formed by reacting Np(VII) with a compound of the alkali metal nitrate and ozone. Additional compounds have been produced by reacting NpO3 and water with solid alkali and alkaline peroxides at temperatures of 400 - 600 °C for 15–30 hours. Some of these include Ba3(NpO5)2, Ba2NaNpO6, and Ba2LiNpO6. Also, a considerable number of hexavalent neptunium oxides are formed by reacting solid-state NpO2 with various alkali or alkaline earth oxides in an environment of flowing oxygen. Many of the resulting compounds also have an equivalent compound that substitutes uranium for neptunium. Some compounds that have been characterized include Na2Np2O7, Na4NpO5, Na6NpO6, and Na2NpO4. These can be obtained by heating different combinations of NpO2 and Na2O to various temperature thresholds and further heating will also cause these compounds to exhibit different neptunium allotropes. The lithium neptunate oxides Li6NpO6 and Li4NpO5 can be obtained with similar reactions of NpO2 and Li2O.

A large number of additional alkali and alkaline neptunium oxide compounds such as Cs4Np5O17 and Cs2Np3O10 have been characterized with various production methods. Neptunium has also been observed to form ternary oxides with many additional elements in groups 3 through 7, although these compounds are much less well studied.

Halides 

Although neptunium halide compounds have not been nearly as well studied as its oxides, a fairly large number have been successfully characterized. Of these, neptunium fluorides have been the most extensively researched, largely because of their potential use in separating the element from nuclear waste products. Four binary neptunium fluoride compounds, NpF3, NpF4, NpF5, and NpF6, have been reported. The first two are fairly stable and were first prepared in 1947 through the following reactions:
NpO2 +  H2 + 3 HF → NpF3 + 2 H2O   (400°C)
NpF3 +  O2 + HF → NpF4 +  H2O  (400°C)
Later, NpF4 was obtained directly by heating NpO2 to various temperatures in mixtures of either hydrogen fluoride or pure fluorine gas. NpF5 is much more difficult to create and most known preparation methods involve reacting NpF4 or NpF6 compounds with various other fluoride compounds. NpF5 will decompose into NpF4 and NpF6 when heated to around 320 °C.

NpF6 or neptunium hexafluoride is extremely volatile, as are its adjacent actinide compounds uranium hexafluoride (UF6) and plutonium hexafluoride (PuF6). This volatility has attracted a large amount of interest to the compound in an attempt to devise a simple method for extracting neptunium from spent nuclear power station fuel rods. NpF6 was first prepared in 1943 by reacting NpF3 and gaseous fluorine at very high temperatures and the first bulk quantities were obtained in 1958 by heating NpF4 and dripping pure fluorine on it in a specially prepared apparatus. Additional methods that have successfully produced neptunium hexafluoride include reacting BrF3 and BrF5 with NpF4 and by reacting several different neptunium oxide and fluoride compounds with anhydrous hydrogen fluorides.

Four neptunium oxyfluoride compounds, NpO2F, NpOF3, NpO2F2, and NpOF4, have been reported, although none of them have been extensively studied. NpO2F2 is a pinkish solid and can be prepared by reacting NpO3 · H2O and Np2F5 with pure fluorine at around 330 °C. NpOF3 and NpOF4 can be produced by reacting neptunium oxides with anhydrous hydrogen fluoride at various temperatures. Neptunium also forms a wide variety of fluoride compounds with various elements. Some of these that have been characterized include CsNpF6, Rb2NpF7, Na3NpF8, and K3NpO2F5.

Two neptunium chlorides, NpCl3 and NpCl4, have been characterized. Although several attempts to create NpCl5 have been made, they have not been successful. NpCl3 is created by reducing neptunium dioxide with hydrogen and carbon tetrachloride (CCl4) and NpCl4 by reacting a neptunium oxide with CCl4 at around 500 °C. Other neptunium chloride compounds have also been reported, including NpOCl2, Cs2NpCl6, Cs3NpO2Cl4, and Cs2NaNpCl6. Neptunium bromides NpBr3 and NpBr4 have also been created; the latter by reacting aluminium bromide with NpO2 at 350 °C and the former in an almost identical procedure but with zinc present. The neptunium iodide NpI3 has also been prepared by the same method as NpBr3.

Chalcogenides, pnictides, and carbides 

Neptunium chalcogen and pnictogen compounds have been well studied primarily as part of research into their electronic and magnetic properties and their interactions in the natural environment. Pnictide and carbide compounds have also attracted interest because of their presence in the fuel of several advanced nuclear reactor designs, although the latter group has not had nearly as much research as the former.

Chalcogenides
A wide variety of neptunium sulfide compounds have been characterized, including the pure sulfide compounds NpS, NpS3, Np2S5, Np3S5, Np2S3, and Np3S4. Of these, Np2S3, prepared by reacting NpO2 with hydrogen sulfide and carbon disulfide at around 1000 °C, is the most well-studied and three allotropic forms are known. The α form exists up to around 1230 °C, the β up to 1530 °C, and the γ form, which can also exist as Np3S4, at higher temperatures. NpS can be created by reacting Np2S3 and neptunium metal at 1600 °C and Np3S5 can be prepared by the decomposition of Np2S3 at 500 °C or by reacting sulfur and neptunium hydride at 650 °C. Np2S5 is made by heating a mixture of Np3S5 and pure sulfur to 500 °C. All of the neptunium sulfides except for the β and γ forms of Np2S3 are isostructural with the equivalent uranium sulfide and several, including NpS, α−Np2S3, and β−Np2S3 are also isostructural with the equivalent plutonium sulfide. The oxysulfides NpOS, Np4O4S, and Np2O2S have also been created, although the latter three have not been well studied. NpOS was first prepared in 1985 by vacuum sealing NpO2, Np3S5, and pure sulfur in a quartz tube and heating it to 900 °C for one week.

Neptunium selenide compounds that have been reported include NpSe, NpSe3, Np2Se3, Np2Se5, Np3Se4, and Np3Se5. All of these have only been obtained by heating neptunium hydride and selenium metal to various temperatures in a vacuum for an extended period of time and Np2Se3 is only known to exist in the γ allotrope at relatively high temperatures. Two neptunium oxyselenide compounds are known, NpOSe and Np2O2Se, are formed with similar methods by replacing the neptunium hydride with neptunium dioxide. The known neptunium telluride compounds NpTe, NpTe3, Np3Te4, Np2Te3, and Np2O2Te are formed by similar procedures to the selenides and Np2O2Te is isostructural to the equivalent uranium and plutonium compounds. No neptunium−polonium compounds have been reported.

Pnictides and carbides
Neptunium nitride (NpN) was first prepared in 1953 by reacting neptunium hydride and ammonia gas at around 750 °C in a quartz capillary tube. Later, it was produced by reacting different mixtures of nitrogen and hydrogen with neptunium metal at various temperatures. It has also been created by the reduction of neptunium dioxide with diatomic nitrogen gas at 1550 °C. NpN is isomorphous with uranium mononitride (UN) and plutonium mononitride (PuN) and has a melting point of 2830 °C under a nitrogen pressure of around 1 MPa. Two neptunium phosphide compounds have been reported, NpP and Np3P4. The first has a face centered cubic structure and is prepared by converting neptunium metal to a powder and then reacting it with phosphine gas at 350 °C. Np3P4 can be created by reacting neptunium metal with red phosphorus at 740 °C in a vacuum and then allowing any extra phosphorus to sublimate away. The compound is non-reactive with water but will react with nitric acid to produce Np(IV) solution.

Three neptunium arsenide compounds have been prepared, NpAs, NpAs2, and Np3As4. The first two were first created by heating arsenic and neptunium hydride in a vacuum-sealed tube for about a week. Later, NpAs was also made by confining neptunium metal and arsenic in a vacuum tube, separating them with a quartz membrane, and heating them to just below neptunium's melting point of 639 °C, which is slightly higher than the arsenic's sublimation point of 615 °C. Np3As4 is prepared by a similar procedure using iodine as a transporting agent. NpAs2 crystals are brownish gold and Np3As4 is black. The neptunium antimonide compound NpSb was created in 1971 by placing equal quantities of both elements in a vacuum tube, heating them to the melting point of antimony, and then heating it further to 1000 °C for sixteen days. This procedure also created trace amounts of an additional antimonide compound Np3Sb4. One neptunium-bismuth compound, NpBi, has also been reported.

The neptunium carbides NpC, Np2C3, and NpC2 (tentative) have been reported, but have not characterized in detail despite the high importance and utility of actinide carbides as advanced nuclear reactor fuel. NpC is a non-stoichiometric compound, and could be better labelled as NpCx (0.82 ≤ x ≤ 0.96). It may be obtained from the reaction of neptunium hydride with graphite at 1400 °C or by heating the constituent elements together in an electric arc furnace using a tungsten electrode. It reacts with excess carbon to form pure Np2C3. NpC2 is formed from heating NpO2 in a graphite crucible at 2660–2800 °C.

Other inorganic compounds 

Hydrides
Neptunium reacts with hydrogen in a similar manner to its neighbor plutonium, forming the hydrides NpH2+x (face-centered cubic) and NpH3 (hexagonal). These are isostructural with the corresponding plutonium hydrides, although unlike PuH2+x, the lattice parameters of NpH2+x become greater as the hydrogen content (x) increases. The hydrides require extreme care in handling as they decompose in a vacuum at 300 °C to form finely divided neptunium metal, which is pyrophoric.

Phosphates, sulfates, and carbonates
Being chemically stable, neptunium phosphates have been investigated for potential use in immobilizing nuclear waste. Neptunium pyrophosphate (α-NpP2O7), a green solid, has been produced in the reaction between neptunium dioxide and boron phosphate at 1100 °C, though neptunium(IV) phosphate has so far remained elusive. The series of compounds NpM2(PO4)3, where M is an alkali metal (Li, Na, K, Rb, or Cs), are all known. Some neptunium sulfates have been characterized, both aqueous and solid and at various oxidation states of neptunium (IV through VI have been observed). Additionally, neptunium carbonates have been investigated to achieve a better understanding of the behavior of neptunium in geological repositories and the environment, where it may come into contact with carbonate and bicarbonate aqueous solutions and form soluble complexes.

Organometallic compounds 

A few organoneptunium compounds are known and chemically characterized, although not as many as for uranium due to neptunium's scarcity and radioactivity. The most well known organoneptunium compounds are the cyclopentadienyl and cyclooctatetraenyl compounds and their derivatives. The trivalent cyclopentadienyl compound Np(C5H5)3·THF was obtained in 1972 from reacting Np(C5H5)3Cl with sodium, although the simpler Np(C5H5) could not be obtained. Tetravalent neptunium cyclopentadienyl, a reddish-brown complex, was synthesized in 1968 by reacting neptunium(IV) chloride with potassium cyclopentadienide:

NpCl4 + 4 KC5H5 → Np(C5H5)4 + 4 KCl

It is soluble in benzene and THF, and is less sensitive to oxygen and water than Pu(C5H5)3 and Am(C5H5)3. Other Np(IV) cyclopentadienyl compounds are known for many ligands: they have the general formula (C5H5)3NpL, where L represents a ligand.
Neptunocene, Np(C8H8)2, was synthesized in 1970 by reacting neptunium(IV) chloride with K2(C8H8). It is isomorphous to uranocene and plutonocene, and they behave chemically identically: all three compounds are insensitive to water or dilute bases but are sensitive to air, reacting quickly to form oxides, and are only slightly soluble in benzene and toluene. Other known neptunium cyclooctatetraenyl derivatives include Np(RC8H7)2 (R = ethanol, butanol) and KNp(C8H8)·2THF, which is isostructural to the corresponding plutonium compound. In addition, neptunium hydrocarbyls have been prepared, and solvated triiodide complexes of neptunium are a precursor to many organoneptunium and inorganic neptunium compounds.

Coordination complexes 

There is much interest in the coordination chemistry of neptunium, because its five oxidation states all exhibit their own distinctive chemical behavior, and the coordination chemistry of the actinides is heavily influenced by the actinide contraction (the greater-than-expected decrease in ionic radii across the actinide series, analogous to the lanthanide contraction).

Solid state 

Few neptunium(III) coordination compounds are known, because Np(III) is readily oxidized by atmospheric oxygen while in aqueous solution.

Many neptunium(IV) coordination compounds have been reported, the first one being , which is isostructural with the analogous uranium(IV) coordination compound. Other Np(IV) coordination compounds are known, some involving other metals such as cobalt (·8H2O, formed at 400 K) and copper (·6H2O, formed at 600 K). Complex nitrate compounds are also known: the experimenters who produced them in 1986 and 1987 produced single crystals by slow evaporation of the Np(IV) solution at ambient temperature in concentrated nitric acid and excess 2,2′-pyrimidine.

The coordination chemistry of neptunium(V) has been extensively researched due to the presence of cation–cation interactions in the solid state, which had been already known for actinyl ions. Some known such compounds include the neptunyl dimer ·8H2O and neptunium glycolate, both of which form green crystals.

Neptunium(VI) compounds range from the simple oxalate  (which is unstable, usually becoming Np(IV)) to such complicated compounds as the green . Extensive study has been performed on compounds of the form , where M represents a monovalent cation and An is either uranium, neptunium, or plutonium.

Since 1967, when neptunium(VII) was discovered, some coordination compounds with neptunium in the +7 oxidation state have been prepared and studied. This compound forms dark green prismatic crystals with maximum edge length 0.15–0.4 mm.

In aqueous solution 

Most neptunium coordination complexes known in solution involve the element in the +4, +5, and +6 oxidation states: only a few studies have been done on neptunium(III) and (VII) coordination complexes. A great many complexes for the other neptunium oxidation states are known: the inorganic ligands involved are the halides, iodate, azide, nitride, nitrate, thiocyanate, sulfate, carbonate, chromate, and phosphate. Many organic ligands are known to be able to be used in neptunium coordination complexes: they include acetate, propionate, glycolate, lactate, oxalate, malonate, phthalate, mellitate, and citrate.

Analogously to its neighbours, uranium and plutonium, the order of the neptunium ions in terms of complex formation ability is Np4+ >  ≥ Np3+ > . (The relative order of the middle two neptunium ions depends on the ligands and solvents used.) The stability sequence for Np(IV), Np(V), and Np(VI) complexes with monovalent inorganic ligands is F− >  > SCN− >  > Cl− > ; the order for divalent inorganic ligands is  >  > . These follow the strengths of the corresponding acids. The divalent ligands are more strongly complexing than the monovalent ones.  can also form the complex ions [] (M = Al, Ga, Sc, In, Fe, Cr, Rh) in perchloric acid solution: the strength of interaction between the two cations follows the order Fe > In > Sc > Ga > Al. The neptunyl and uranyl ions can also form a complex together.

See also 

 Protactinium compounds
 Promethium compounds

References 

Neptunium
Neptunium compounds
Chemical compounds by element